The Chancellor of Keele University is the ceremonial head of Keele University. The position was originally the President of the University College of North Staffordshire, changing to the Chancellor when the institution became a full university in 1962.

President of the University College of North Staffordshire

1949 – 1956 John Ryder, 5th Earl of Harrowby
1956 – 1962 Princess Margaret, Countess of Snowdon (from 1961 Countess of Snowdon)

Chancellor

1962 – 1986 Princess Margaret, Countess of Snowdon
1986 – 2002 Claus Moser, Baron Moser
2002 – 2012 Sir David Weatherall
2012 – 2022 Sir Jonathon Porritt
2022 – date  James Timpson

References